The Wounded Man can refer to:

 The Wounded Man (painting) (L'Homme blessé), a 19th-century painting by Gustave Courbet
 The Wounded Man (film) (L'Homme blessé), a 1983 French film directed by Patrice Chéreau
 Wound Man — an illustration which first appeared in European surgical texts in the Middle Ages. The illustrations were an important anatomical guide to potential injuries for surgeons or wound doctors at the time.

See also
Wounded Man, Japanese Manga